Kaiser Wilhelm II abdicated as German Emperor and King of Prussia in November 1918. The abdication was announced on 9 November by Prince Maximilian of Baden and was formally enacted by Wilhelm's written statement on 28 November, made while in exile in Amerongen, the Netherlands. This ended the German Empire as well as the House of Hohenzollern's 500-year rule over Prussia and its predecessor state, Brandenburg. Wilhelm ruled Germany and Prussia from 15 June 1888 through 9 November 1918, when he went into exile. Following the abdication statement and German Revolution of 1918–19, the German nobility as a legally defined class was abolished. On promulgation of the Weimar Constitution on 11 August 1919, all Germans were declared equal before the law. Ruling princes of the constituent states of Germany also had to give up their monarchical titles and domains, of which there were 22. Of these princely heads of state, four held the title of king or König (the kings of Prussia, Bavaria, Saxony and Württemberg), six held the title of grand duke or Großherzog, five held the title of duke or Herzog, while seven held the title prince (sovereign prince, Fürst).

Abdication negotiations

After the Oberste Heeresleitung stated the German front was about to collapse and asked for immediate negotiation of an armistice, the cabinet of Chancellor Georg von Hertling resigned on 30 September 1918. Hertling, with the support of Haußmann, Oberst Hans von Haeften and Erich Ludendorff suggested Prince Maximilian of Baden as his successor and to have Wilhelm II appoint Maximilian as Chancellor of Germany and minister president of Prussia. When Maximilian arrived in Berlin on 1 October, Emperor Wilhelm II convinced him to take the post and appointed him on 3 October 1918. The message asking for an armistice went out on 4 October, hopefully to be accepted by President of the United States Woodrow Wilson. In late October, Wilson's third note seemed to imply that negotiations of an armistice would be dependent on the abdication of Wilhelm II. On 1 November, Maximilian wrote to all the ruling Princes of Germany, asking them whether they would approve of an abdication by the Emperor. On 6 November, Maximilian urged Wilhelm II to abdicate. The Kaiser, who had fled from Berlin to the Spa, Belgium OHL-headquarters, was willing to consider abdication only as Emperor, not as King of Prussia.

Around 4 November, delegations of sailors dispersed to all of the country's big cities. By 7 November the revolution had seized all large coastal cities as well as Hanover, Braunschweig, Frankfurt on Main, and Munich.

On 7 November, Maximilian met with Friedrich Ebert, leader of the Social Democratic Party of Germany, and discussed his plan to go to Spa and convince Wilhelm II to abdicate. He was thinking about Prince Eitel Friedrich of Prussia, Wilhelm's second son, being the regent. However, the outbreak of the German Revolution in Berlin prevented Maximilian from implementing his plan. Ebert decided that to keep control of the socialist uprising, the emperor had to resign quickly and that a new government was required.

Abdication and flight

Even though the uprising in Berlin had swelled into a revolution, Wilhelm could not decide whether to abdicate. He recognized that he had likely lost his imperial crown, but he hoped to retain the Prussian kingship, believing that as monarch of two-thirds of Germany he could play a role in any new government. This ultimately proved to be impossible. Wilhelm had believed that he ruled as emperor in a personal union with Prussia. Under the Constitution of the German Empire, however, the empire was a federation of states under the permanent presidency of Prussia. This meant that the imperial crown was tied to the Prussian crown, and one crown could not be renounced without renouncing the other.

Hope of preserving the monarchy dwindled rapidly in the face of growing revolutionary unrest. With masses gathering in Berlin, Prince Maximilian unilaterally announced Wilhelm's abdication of both crowns at noon on 9 November 1918, as well as the renunciation of Crown Prince Wilhelm. The proclamation, written by Theodor Lewald, the Under Secretary of State at the Imperial Home Office, read:

The final mention referred to the potential reunion of German-Austria to the rest of Germany, following the dissolution of the multi-ethnic Austro-Hungarian empire.

Maximilian himself was forced to resign later the same day when it became clear that only Ebert could effectively exert control. Later that day, one of Ebert's secretaries of state (ministers), Social Democrat Philipp Scheidemann, proclaimed Germany to be a republic. General Wilhelm Groener, Ludendorff's replacement, then informed Wilhelm that the army definitely would not fight to keep him on the throne. Army commander and lifelong royalist Paul von Hindenburg felt obliged, and with some embarrassment, to advise Wilhelm to give up the crown. It was only then that Wilhelm accepted the fait accompli and agreed to give up the throne. On 10 November, Wilhelm boarded a train and went into exile in the Netherlands, which had remained neutral throughout the war.

Article 227 of the Treaty of Versailles, which was concluded in early 1919, provided for the prosecution of Wilhelm "for a supreme offence against international morality and the sanctity of treaties". Queen Wilhelmina of the Netherlands and the Dutch government, however, refused the Allies' requests to extradite him. King George V wrote that his cousin was "the greatest criminal in history", but opposed Prime Minister David Lloyd George's proposal to "hang the Kaiser". U.S. President Woodrow Wilson also opposed extradition, arguing that punishing Wilhelm would destabilize international order and lose the peace.

"Statement of Abdication"
Wilhelm first settled in Amerongen, where on 28 November he issued a belated statement of abdication of both the Prussian and imperial thrones. He also released his soldiers and officials in both Prussia and the empire from their oaths of loyalty to him.

Statement of Abdication. I herewith renounce for all time claims to the throne of Prussia and to the German Imperial throne connected therewith. At the same time I release all officials of the German Empire and of Prussia, as well as all officers, non-commissioned officers and men of the navy and of the Prussian army, as well as the troops of the federated states of Germany, from the oath of fidelity which they tendered to me as their Emperor, King and Commander-in-Chief. I expect of them that until the re-establishment of order in the German Empire they shall render assistance to those in actual power in Germany, in protecting the German people from the threatening dangers of anarchy, famine, and foreign rule. Proclaimed under our own hand and with the imperial seal attached.  Amerongen, 28 November 1918. Signed WILLIAM.

Efforts to restore the Kaiserreich

Wilhelm moved to the municipality of Doorn, to Huis Doorn on 15 May 1920. The Weimar Republic allowed Wilhelm to remove twenty-three railway wagons of packages from the New Palace at Potsdam. In 1922, Wilhelm published the first volume of his memoirs—a very slim volume that insisted he was not guilty of initiating World War I and defended his conduct throughout his reign, especially in matters of foreign policy. In the early 1930s, Wilhelm apparently hoped that the successes of the German Nazi Party would stimulate interest in a restoration of the monarchy, with his eldest grandson as the fourth Kaiser. His second wife, Hermine Reuss of Greiz, actively petitioned the Nazi government on her husband's behalf, but the petitions were ignored.

After Hindenburg appointed Adolf Hitler as chancellor in 1933, the Nazi regime restored the Prussian imperial flag. On 21 March 1933, the new Reichstag was constituted with an opening ceremony at the Garrison Church in Potsdam, which was until 1918, the Parish church of the Prussian royal family. This "Day of Potsdam" was held to demonstrate unity between the Nazi movement and the old Prussian elite and military. Hitler appeared in a morning coat and humbly greeted Hindenburg.

After the deposed heir of Wilhelm II, Crown Prince Wilhelm, joined Der Stahlhelm, which in 1931 merged into the Harzburg Front, Hitler visited the former Crown Prince at Cecilienhof in 1926, in 1933 (on the "Day of Potsdam"), and in 1935. In September 1939, Kaiser Wilhelm's adjutant, wrote on his behalf to Hitler, stating that the House of Hohenzollern "remained loyal" stating nine Prussian Princes (one son and eight grandchildren) were stationed at the front, concluding "because of the special circumstances that require residence in a neutral foreign country, His Majesty must personally decline to make the aforementioned comment. The Emperor has therefore charged me with making a communication."

In March 1939, Hitler demanded the return of Danzig and the Polish Corridor, a strip of land that separated East Prussia from the rest of Germany. German forces then invaded Poland, which started World War II. The invasion restored the Prussian territories lost in 1918.

When Hitler invaded the Netherlands in May 1940, Wilhelm declined Prime Minister Winston Churchill's offer to grant Wilhelm asylum in the United Kingdom. Wilhelm preferred to spend his remaining days at Huis Doorn. He died there on 4 June 1941.

In admiration of Hitler's success during the opening months of the war, Wilhelm sent a congratulatory telegram to Hitler in May 1940 when the Netherlands surrendered: "My Fuhrer, I congratulate you and hope that under your marvellous leadership the German monarchy will be restored completely." The aging Wilhelm then retired completely from public life.

In another telegram to Hitler upon the fall of Paris a month later, Wilhelm stated, "Congratulations, you have won using my troops." In a letter to his daughter Victoria Louise, Duchess of Brunswick, he wrote triumphantly, "Thus is the pernicious Entente Cordiale of Uncle Edward VII brought to nought." In a letter of 1940 to his sister Princess Margaret of Prussia, Wilhelm wrote: "The hand of God is creating a new world & working miracles.... We are becoming the U.S. of Europe under German leadership, a united European Continent."

However, Wilhem's opinion of Hitler behind closed doors was much less favourable. In a 1938 interview with Ken magazine, he said of the dictator:

Hohenzollern claims (post 1919)

Friedrich Wilhelm was the eldest son of Kaiser Wilhelm II and the last crown prince of the German Empire and the Kingdom of Prussia. Crown Prince Wilhelm abdicated around the same time as his father in 1918. A military commander, he was second in command to his Commander in Chief father, with Generalfeldmarschall Crown Prince Rupprecht of Bavaria and Generalfeldmarschall Albrecht, Duke of Württemberg, at German military headquarters during World War I until the armistice of 11 November 1918. As such, Wilhelm II and Crown Prince Wilhelm directly commanded their Chief of the General Staff, General Paul von Hindenburg, throughout the war.

In 1933, von Hindenburg appointed Nazi Party Leader Adolf Hitler as the new Chancellor of Germany. Upon Hindenburg's death, Hitler officially became Führer and Chancellor of the Realm/Reich. Previously in Germany (1871-1918), the Chancellor was responsible only to the German Kaiser. In 1933, the Nazi regime abolished the flag of the Weimar Republic and officially restored the Imperial German flag, alongside the Swastika, however this would only last until 1935.

In 1916, Crown Prince Wilhelm invested Hermann Göring, who later became a senior Nazi figure, with an Iron Cross after Göring flew reconnaissance and bombing missions in a Feldflieger Abteilung 25 in Prince Wilhelm's Fifth Army. Like many veterans, Göring believed the stab-in-the-back legend, whereby the German Army had not actually lost World War I, but had been betrayed by Marxists, Jews, and especially Republicans, who had overthrown the German monarchy. In 1933, with Hitler and the Nazi Party in power, Göring was appointed minister of the interior for Prussia. for which he established a Prussian police force called the Geheime Staatspolizei, or Gestapo. The headquarters of the Reich Security Main Office, Sicherheitsdienst, Gestapo, and Schutzstaffel (SS) in Nazi Germany (1933-1945) was "symbolically" housed at Prinz Albrecht - Strasse, off Wilhelm - straße, in Berlin.

In the early 1930s, Wilhelm II apparently hoped that the successes of the Nazi Party would stimulate interest in a restoration of the monarchy, with Crown Prince Wilhelm's son as the fourth Kaiser. After Crown Prince Wilhelm joined Der Stahlhelm, which merged in 1931 into the Harzburg Front, Adolf Hitler visited him at Cecilienhof in 1926, 1933 (on the "Day of Potsdam") and 1935. In May 1940, Prince Wilhelm of Prussia, the son of Crown Prince Wilhelm and his nominee to be the "fourth Kaiser," took part in the invasion of France. He was wounded during the fighting in Valenciennes and died on 26 May 1940. The service drew over 50,000 mourners. His death and the ensuing sympathy of the German public toward a member of the former German royal house greatly bothered Hitler. He began to see the Hohenzollerns as a threat to his power. In 1940, Hitler issued the Prinzenerlass, which prohibited princes from German royal houses from serving in the military (the Wehrmacht), but did not prohibit their membership in military Sturmabteilung (SA) and SS units.

Prince August Wilhelm of Prussia was the fourth son of Kaiser Wilhelm II and his first wife, Augusta Victoria. Already holding a position in the Prussian state, August Wilhelm became a member of the German Reichstag in 1933. He hoped "that Hitler would one day hoist him or his son Alexander up to the vacant throne of the Kaiser". In 1939, August Wilhelm was made an SA-Obergruppenführer, the second highest SA rank. Translated as "senior group leader", Obergruppenführer was a Nazi Party paramilitary rank first created in 1932 as a rank of the SA and adopted by the SS one year later. Until 1942, it was the highest commissioned SS rank, inferior only to Reichsführer-SS Heinrich Himmler.
As listed, Prince August was given Nazi Party membership number 24, as number 12 was SS-Obergruppenführer Philipp Bouhler. He was a SS-Reichsleiter, the same SS rank as Himmler and Joseph Goebbels. He was second only to the rank of the Führer in the Nazi Party. Philipp Bouhler worked alongside Philipp, Landgrave of Hesse, who was a close friend of Göring. Bouhler was head of Nazi Action T4 euthanasia program for children and the handicapped (70,000 murders). Deputy Führer Rudolf Hesse, also ranked SS-Obergruppenführer and SS-Reichsleiter,  was number 14. Hesse and Hitler, like Göring, believed in the stab-in-the-back myth.

After making derogatory remarks in 1942 about Goebbels, Prince August was denounced, sidelined, and banned from making public speeches. In 1945, with former Crown Princess Cecilie, August fled the approaching Red Army to Kronberg to take refuge with his aunt Princess Margaret of Prussia.

Prince Alexander Ferdinand was the only son of Prince August and his wife Princess Alexandra Victoria. In 1939, Prince Alexander was a first lieutenant in the Air Force Signal Corps. Like his father, Prince August hoped that Hitler "would one day hoist him, or his son, up to the vacant throne of the Kaiser". Prince Alexander's and his father's support of the Nazis caused disagreements among the Hohenzollerns, with Wilhelm II urging them both to leave the Nazi Party. In 1933, Prince Alexander Ferdinand quit the SA and became a private in the German regular army. In 1934, Berlin leaked out that the 21-year-old Prince had quit the SA because Hitler had chosen him to be his successor as "head man in Germany when he [Hitler] no longer can carry the torch". The report said that Goebbels was expected to oppose the prince's nomination. Unlike many princes untrusted and removed from their commands by Hitler, Prince Alexander was the only Hohenzollern allowed to remain at his post.

Abolished federal princedoms of the Kaiserreich
 For initial details of the abolished Kaiserreich of Wilhelm II see: List of German monarchs in 1918
 For post abdication NSDAP membership of the abolished nobility see: German nobility in Nazi Germany

See also
 Abdication of Nicholas II

References

Bibliography

 .
 .
 
 
 
 
 , Google Books.
 
 
 Klee, Ernst: Das Personenlexikon zum Dritten Reich. Wer war was vor und nach 1945. Fischer Taschenbuch Verlag, Zweite aktualisierte Auflage, Frankfurt am Main 2005 
 Klee, Ernst Das Kulturlexikon zum Dritten Reich. Wer war was vor und nach 1945. S. Fischer, Frankfurt am Main 2007 
 .
 
 
 
 .

External links

 The German Emperor as shown in his public utterances
 The German emperor's speeches: being a selection from the speeches, edicts, letters, and telegrams of the Emperor William II
 , mostly in German
 
 
 Historical film documents on Wilhelm II from the time of World War I at European Film Gateway

Wilhelm II, German Emperor
Politics of the German Empire
German Revolution of 1918–1919
Monarchy in Germany
House of Hohenzollern
Abdication
1918 in Germany
November 1918 events